Parun District is a district of Nuristan Province in Afghanistan.  The district centre is Parun, which is a small town.

See also 

 Parun

Notes

External links 

 Map of Settlements AIMS, January 2009

Districts of Nuristan Province